Henry Vane, 1st Earl of Darlington, PC (c. 1705 – 6 March 1758), known as Lord Barnard between 1753 and 1754, was a British politician who sat in the House of Commons from 1726 to 1753 when he succeeded to a peerage as Baron Barnard.

Life
Vane was the eldest son of Gilbert Vane, 2nd Baron Barnard of Raby Castle, Staindrop, county Durham, and his wife, Mary Randyll, daughter of Morgan Randyll of Chilworth, Surrey. His sister Anne Vane was a mistress to Frederick, Prince of Wales. He was educated privately. He married Lady Grace Fitzroy, daughter of Charles FitzRoy, 2nd Duke of Cleveland on 2 September 1725.

Career

Vane contested County Durham as a Whig on his family's interest at the 1722 British general election, but was unsuccessful. He was brought in by the ministry as Member of Parliament for Launceston at a by-election on 31 May 1726. At the 1727 British general election he planned to stand for county Durham, but stood down to avoid splitting the Whig vote, and the ministry found him another seat at St Mawes where he was returned as MP unopposed. He went into opposition, and attached himself to his wife's first cousin William Pulteney. He never spoke in the House, which was said to be because of 'a monstrous tongue which lolled out of his mouth'. He was returned again in a contest for St Mawes at the 1734 British general election, on the Boscawen interest, and, at the 1741 British general election, was returned unopposed as MP for Ripon on the Aislabie interest.

After Walpole's fall in 1742, Pulteney procured for Vane a lucrative sinecure as Vice-Treasurer and Paymaster General of Ireland and he also became a Privy Counsellor (Ireland) in 1742. Vane lost his Irish post when Pulteney and his adherents were turned out in December 1744. He was finally returned for county Durham at the 1747 British general election as a government supporter. He became a follower of his kinsman, the Duke of Newcastle, cultivating him so assiduously that in 1749 he was appointed a Lord of the Treasury which he retained to 1755. On 27 April 1753 he succeeded to the peerage as 3rd Baron Barnard on the death of his father and became Lord Lieutenant of Durham from 1753 to 1758. He was rewarded by Newcastle with an earldom, as 1st Earl of Darlington and 1st Viscount Barnard on 3 April 1754 and held the post of Joint Paymaster of the Forces between 1755 and 1756.

Death and legacy
Vane died on 6 March 1758. He was succeeded in his titles by his son Henry. With his wife Grace, he had seven children
 Lady Mary Vane
Henry Vane, 2nd Earl of Darlington, (17268 Sep 1792)
 Lady Anne Vane, a botanist (25 June 172618 February 1776)
 Hon. Frederick Vane, b. 26 June 1732
Hon. Charles Vane
 Hon. Raby Vane (2 January 1736 – 23 October 1769)
Lady Harriet Vane (27 January 1739January 1759)

References

External links
 

|-

|-

1705 births
1758 deaths
Earls in the Peerage of Great Britain
Lord-Lieutenants of Durham
Vane, Henry
Members of the Privy Council of Ireland
Paymasters of the Forces
Members of the Parliament of Great Britain for constituencies in Cornwall
Whig (British political party) MPs
British MPs 1722–1727
British MPs 1727–1734
British MPs 1734–1741
British MPs 1747–1754
Henry
Barons Barnard
People from Staindrop